Davao Region, formerly called Southern Mindanao, is an administrative region in the Philippines, designated as Region XI. It is situated at the southeastern portion of Mindanao and comprises five provinces: Davao de Oro, Davao del Norte, Davao del Sur, Davao Oriental and Davao Occidental.

The region encloses Davao Gulf, and its regional center is Davao City. Dávao is the Hispanicized pronunciation of daba-daba, the Bagobo word for "fire".

Etymology
Many historians believe that the name Davao is the mixture of the three names that three different tribes, the earliest settlers in the region, had for the Davao River. The Manobos, an aboriginal tribe, referred to the Davao Rivers as Davohoho. Another tribe, the Bagobos, referred to the river as Davohaha, which means "fire", while another tribe, the Guiangan tribe, called the river as Duhwow.

History
The history of the region dates back to the times when various tribes occupied the region. It is believed that the Manobos, Mandayas, Kalagans, Mansakas, and the Bagobos occupied the area. These are the same tribes that created the small settlements and communities that eventually became Mindanao.

Maguindanao era
The Davao Region was once part of Sultanate of Maguindanao. Early settlers of the region were Maguindanaons, Maranaos and the Tausugs under the Sultanate of Sulu. Datu Bago was one of the Datu in Davao Gulf who resisted the Spanish Empire colonization on the region.

First European contact
The Davao Gulf area was the first region in the country that was in contact with the Europeans, with such contacts taking place as early as 16th century. The Portuguese preceded the Spaniards, who were the ones to colonize the region albeit much later, in sighting and visiting the region. In 1512, Francisco Serrano was shipwrecked in the shallow waters and coral reefs of Cape of San Agustín, located in what is now the province of Davao Oriental. In 1538, Francisco de Castro, a Portuguese ship captain, was driven by strong winds to the southeastern coast of Mindanao. He baptized several chieftains in the area.

Around January 1546, Francis Xavier, a Jesuit priest, left Malacca and went to Molucca Islands, then called the Spice Islands, where the Portuguese had some settlements, and for a year and a half he preached the Gospel to the inhabitants of Amboyna, Ternate, Baranura, and other lesser islands. It is claimed by some that during this expedition he landed on the island of Mindanao, which is confirmed by some writers of the seventeenth century, and in the Bull of canonization issued in 1623. It is also said that he is the one to have preached the Gospel in Mindanao.

Spanish administration
For centuries the tribes lived in relative peace until the Spanish, under the adventurous Spanish businessman Don Jose Oyanguren, arrived in the region in 1847. At that time, the Kalagan Moro chieftain Datu Bago was in control of the area in what is now Davao City. Don Oyanguren attempted to conquer the area which Datu Bago ruled; although he failed at first, the Moro chieftain eventually evacuated his people to live in the areas near Mount Apo. This is the time the town of Davao, then called Nueva Vergara by the Spaniards, was established in the year 1848.

Don Oyanguren attempted to develop the region. Although the Spanish gained the upper hand when they finally controlled the ports of the region, the population of Davao grew very slowly until the arrival of Christian missionaries in the area in 1890.

American administration
After the Spanish–American War in 1898, Spanish rule in the region ended. Americans then landed in the region and they subsequently developed the regions communications and transportation systems. During this period, private farm ownership grew in the region. Japanese migration in the region began as two Japanese entrepreneurs, Kyosaburo Ohta and Yoshizo Furukawa, were finding better agricultural lands for building abaca and coconut plantations in the region. The Port of Davao was opened on 1900, becoming the first Philippine international port to be established in the south.

In 1903 until 1914, the region was one of the districts of the former Moro Province in Mindanao. After 1914, the province was replaced by an American colonial agency called Department of Mindanao and Sulu, which spanned the entire Mindanao island except Lanao. The agency lasted from 1914 to 1920.

Wartime Japanese occupation
In 1942, during World War II, as the Japanese occupation of the Philippines began, the region was one of the first among the Philippine regions to be subjected by Japanese occupation. The Japanese immigrants in Davao acted as a fifth column, welcoming the Japanese invaders during World War II. These Japanese were hated by the Moro Muslims and disliked by the Chinese. The Moros were judged as "fully capable of dealing with Japanese fifth columnists and invaders alike." The Moros were to fight the Japanese invaders when they landed at Davao on Mindanao. The Japanese went back to their ships at night to sleep since the Moros struck so much fear into them, even though the Moros were outnumbered by the Japanese. The longest battle of the Allied liberation campaign, the Battle of Davao, took place in 1945. After the war, the region eventually passed to the American hands again for at least almost one year before the formal Philippine independence on July 4, 1946, most of the Japanese living in the region were now integrated in the Filipino population.

Philippine administration

Davao province
Prior to Philippine independence in 1946, the entire region was a single province called Davao Province, with Davao City serving as its capital. It lasted from 1920 until 1967, when the province was split into three provinces in May 1967: Davao del Norte, Davao del Sur and Davao Oriental. After the division, Davao City was officially named its regional center.

Southern Mindanao and Davao Region
Region XI, then known as Southern Mindanao, originally covered 6 provinces (Compostela Valley, Davao del Norte, Davao del Sur, Davao Oriental, South Cotabato and Sarangani), and the cities of Davao, Digos, Panabo, Tagum, Samal, General Santos and Koronadal. Surigao del Sur was moved to the newly created region Caraga on February 23, 1995.

In September 2001, Executive Order No. 36 was enacted which reorganized the regions in Mindanao.

On October 12, 2022, the Regional Peace and Order Council declared the entire region "insurgency-free" after decades of being a stronghold for the communist insurgency, barring some scattered members of the New People's Army that are left in the region.

Administrative divisions

Provinces
Davao Region is subdivided into 5 provinces, 1 highly urbanized city, 5 component cities, 43 municipalities and 1,162 barangays.

Governors and vice governors

Cities

Climate
The region has a generally uniform distribution of rainfall through the year. It lies outside the typhoon belt.

Demographics 

Davao Region is the most populous region in Mindanao and the 7th most populous in the country, with a total of 5,243,536 inhabitants in 2020. Davao City, its regional capital, is also the largest city in Mindanao, with an area of 2,444 km2, the largest in the country and one of the largest in the world, and has 1,632,991 inhabitants in 2015, making it the third most populous city in the country and the most populous city proper in the entire Visayas-Mindanao region. Davao Metropolitan Area, the primary economic and urban build-up area in the region, is also the most populous in the island and the third most populous in the country, with about 2,274,913 inhabitants in that year.

Most of the region's inhabitants speak Cebuano. Filipino and English are also spoken and widely used in schools, businesses, commerce, and industry. In the Davao City Metro Area, a linguistic phenomenon has developed whereby locals have either shifted to Filipino or significantly mix Filipino terms and grammar into their Cebuano speech. Minority indigenous groups of the region speak their own languages as well.

Chinese immigrants are widespread in the region, with a considerable population based in Davao City. Davao Chinatown is one of the two defined Chinatowns in the Philippines, alongside Binondo in Manila. A considerable population of Japanese are also found in the region, most of them also located in Davao City. Before World War II, Davao was and still is heavily populated by Japanese immigrants and their descendants, with Davao City being touted at one point in its history as the Little Tokyo of the Philippines.

Religion
The majority of the region's population are Christians, mostly Catholics; however, there are also Muslims, Buddhists, and Shintoists living in the region.

Economy

While the region's economy is predominantly agri-based, it is now developing into a center for agro-industrial business, trade and tourism. Its competitive advantage is in agri-industry as its products, papayas, mangoes, bananas, pineapples, fresh asparagus, flowers, and fish products are exported internationally. The region can be a vital link to markets in other parts of Mindanao, Brunei Darussalam and parts of Malaysia and Indonesia. There is also a growing call center sector in the region, mostly centered in Davao City.

There is a gradual shift to industrialization as shown with industry's growth rate of 8.1% in 1996. Other economic activities are mining, fishery, forestry and agriculture. Due to the region's rise as the main commercial and industrial hub of Mindanao, many of its workers are oriented to urban services such as putting small-scale businesses and working in commercial industries in thriving urban areas like Davao, Tagum, and Digos. Both private and foreign investors and businessmen are putting up huge business centers in the region, fueling up its commercial growth rate.

The region is also venturing to online business like outsourcing.

Ports and airport
The region's principal ports are the Sasa International Seaport in Sasa and Santa Ana Pier in the Chinatown District, both in Davao City; Panabo Seaport in Davao del Norte; and Mati Seaport in Davao Oriental. The former two, both of which are located in Port of Davao in Davao City, can service both interisland and international shipments. Sasa International Container Port, also located in the Port of Davao, is the busiest in Mindanao.

The international airport in Davao City, Francisco Bangoy International Airport, is the largest and most developed in Mindanao, has the first longest runway in the island, and the third busiest in the country, after Ninoy Aquino International Airport and Mactan–Cebu International Airport. Being the only airport in the island that is currently catering for international destinations, it can handle both domestic and international flights, serving several domestic flights to Manila, Cebu, Bacolod, Iloilo, Zamboanga and other major Philippine cities, and international flights to Doha, Hong Kong, Manado, Quanzhou, and Singapore. Its ATC Tower is the most advanced in the country.

The region is accessible by land, air and sea. The region has adequate communications facilities, reliable power, and an abundant water supply.

In December 2016, President Duterte helped enter a contract with Chinese investors to create a new port in the region of Isla Verde in Davao. This involves the creation of three artificial islands by a set of Chinese companies including CCCC Dredging Group Co. Ltd for $200 million.

Government

Legislators to the House of Representatives for Region 11

Provincial governors and city mayors
 Davao de Oro — Gov. Jayvee Tyron L. Uy (Reporma)
 Davao del Norte — Gov. Edwin I. Jubahib (PDP–Laban)
 Davao del Sur — Gov. Douglas R. Cagas (Independent)
 Davao Occidental - Gov. Claude P. Bautista (Hugpong ng Pagbabago)
 Davao Oriental — Gov. Nelson L. Dayanghirang (Hugpong ng Pagbabago)
 Davao City — Mayor Sebastian Z. Duterte (Hugpong ng Pagbabago)

Education 
The government provides free education at the primary (grade school) and secondary (high school) levels. Some state-run universities in the region are the University of the Philippines Mindanao and the University of Southeastern Philippines. Private colleges / universities in Davao include Ateneo de Davao University, Assumption College of Davao, Holy Cross of Davao College, Holy Child College of Davao, and University of the Immaculate Conception. The literacy rate of the country is 93.9%; Davao City has a literacy rate of 98.05%.

References

External links 
 
 
 

 
Regions of the Philippines